Richard Powys (19 August 1844 – 10 June 1913) was an English cricketer. He played in two first-class matches in New Zealand for Canterbury from 1865 to 1867.

See also
 List of Canterbury representative cricketers

References

External links
 

1844 births
1913 deaths
English cricketers
Canterbury cricketers
People from Broseley